Todman, contextualized as a surname, refers to   game-show production executive "Bill" Todman, fl. late 20th cen.

Others bearing the surname include:
 Bill Todman, Jr. (born 1966), American son of William "Bill" Todman
 Charlene Todman (1931 – 2018), American athlete
 Dan (or D[aniel]. H.) Todman (fl. c. 2000), British war historian 
     
   
 Joseph A. Todman (fl. 1870s), Nevada/California (Lake Tahoe) steamboat-and-food-fish entrepreneur
 Jordan Todman (born 1990), American football player
 Mario Todman (born 1974), British Virgin Islands sprinter  
 McWelling "Mac" Todman (1923 - 1996), British Virgin Islands runner in  1988 Summer Olympics)
    
 Terence Todman (1926 - 2014), U.S. diplomat, native of U.S. Virgin Islands 
 Tonia Todman (born 1958), Australian television personality
 Willis Todman (born 1966), British Virgin Islands sprinter